Carmen Capalbo (November 1, 1925 – March 14, 2010) was a theater director on and off Broadway. 

Among Capalbo's notable productions were a revival of The Threepenny Opera, which was a major Off-Broadway success, and the 1957 premiere of A Moon for the Misbegotten. He won a Special Tony Award in 1956 for The Threepenny Opera and another in 1957 for The Potting Shed. He also directed the world premiere of Robert Kurka's The Good Soldier Schweik for the New York City Opera at Lincoln Center in 1958.

His 1950 marriage to ballet dancer Patricia (Pat) McBride (later Lousada) ended in divorce in 1961. They had two children, director Marco Capalbo and author and photographer Carla Capalbo.

References

External links 
 Carmen Capalbo papers, 1936-1991, held by the Billy Rose Theatre Division, New York Public Library for the Performing Arts

1925 births
2010 deaths
American theatre directors
Artists from New York City
Special Tony Award recipients